A - B - C - D - E - F - G - H - I - J - K - L - M - N - O - P - Q - R - S - T - U - V - W - XYZ

This is a list of rivers in the United States that have names starting with the letter C.  For the main page, which includes links to listings by state, see List of rivers in the United States.

Ca 
Cabin Creek - West Virginia
Cacapon River - West Virginia
Cache Creek - Yolo County, California
Cache River - Arkansas
Cache River - Illinois
Cache La Poudre River - Colorado
Caddo River - Arkansas
Cahaba River - Alabama
Calapooia River - Oregon
Calaveras River - California
Calcasieu River - Louisiana
Calfkiller River - Tennessee
Calfpasture River - Virginia
Caloosahatchee River - Florida
Calumet River - Illinois, Indiana
Calvert Prong of the Little Warrior River - Alabama
Campbells Creek - West Virginia
Canadian River - New Mexico, Oklahoma, Texas
Caney Fork - Tennessee
Caney River - Kansas, Oklahoma
Canisteo River - New York
Canning River - Alaska
Cannon River - Minnesota
Cannonball River - North Dakota
Canoe River - Massachusetts
Canoochee River - Georgia
Canyon Creek - Arizona
Cape Fear River - North Carolina
Carbon River - Washington
Carmans River - New York
Carmel River - California
Carp River - Michigan
Carr River - Rhode Island
Carrabassett River - Maine
Carson River - California, Nevada
Cartecay River - Georgia
Casey Creek - Illinois
Cass River - Michigan
Casselman River - Pennsylvania, Maryland
Castle Creek - South Dakota
Castor Creek - Louisiana
Castor River - Missouri
Catawba River - North Carolina, South Carolina
Catawissa Creek - Pennsylvania
Catharine Creek - New York
Catherine Creek - Oregon
Cattaraugus Creek - New York
Cayuta Creek - New York, Pennsylvania

Ce 
Cedar Creek - Indiana
Cedar Creek - North Dakota
Cedar Creek - West Virginia
Cedar River - Iowa, Minnesota
Cedar River (Antrim County, Michigan) - tributary of the Intermediate River
Cedar River (Gladwin County, Michigan) - tributary of the Tobacco River
Cedar River (Menominee County, Michigan) - tributary of Lake Michigan
Cedar River - New York
Cedar River - Washington

Ch 
Chagrin River - Ohio
Chakachatna River - Alaska
Chandalar River - Alaska
Chaplin River - Kentucky
Chariton River - Iowa, Missouri
Charles River - Massachusetts
Charley River - Alaska
Chassahowitzka River - Florida
Chatanika River - Alaska
Chateauguay River - New York
Chattahoochee River - Alabama, Georgia
Chattooga River - Alabama, Georgia
Chattooga River - North Carolina, South Carolina, Georgia
Chazy River - New York
Cheat River - West Virginia, Pennsylvania
Chehalis River - Washington
Chelan River - Washington
Chemung River - New York, Pennsylvania
Chena River - Alaska
Chenango River - New York
Chepachet River - Rhode Island
Cherry Creek - Colorado
Cherry Creek - South Dakota
Cherry River - West Virginia
Chestatee River - Georgia
Chester River - Delaware, Maryland
Chetco River - Oregon
Chevelon Creek - Arizona
Chewaucan River - Oregon
Chewuch River - Washington
Cheyenne River - Wyoming, South Dakota
Chicago River - Illinois
Chickahominy River - Virginia
Chickasawhay River - Mississippi
Chickwolnepy Stream - New Hampshire
Chicopee River - Massachusetts
Chief River - Wisconsin
Chikaskia River - Kansas, Oklahoma
Childs River - Massachusetts
Chilikadrotna River - Alaska
Chilkat River - Alaska
Chilkoot River - Alaska
Chillisquaque Creek - Pennsylvania
Chipola River - Florida
Chippewa River - Michigan
Chippewa River - Minnesota
Chippewa River - Wisconsin
Chipuxet River - Rhode Island
Chiques Creek - Pennsylvania
Chitina River - Alaska
Chiwawa River - Washington
Chockalog River - Massachusetts, Rhode Island
Chocorua River - New Hampshire
Choctawhatchee River - Alabama, Florida
Choptank River - Delaware, Maryland
Chowchilla River - California
Christina River - Pennsylvania, Maryland, Delaware
Christopher Creek - Arizona
Chugwater Creek - Wyoming
Chuitna River - Alaska
Chunky River - Mississippi
Chute River - Maine

Ci - Cl 
Cibolo Creek - Texas
Cimarron River - New Mexico, Oklahoma, Colorado, Kansas
Cimarron River (Gunnison River) - western Colorado
Cimarron River (Canadian River) - northern New Mexico
Cinder River - Alaska
Cispus River - Washington
Clackamas River - Oregon
Clam River - Wisconsin
Clarence River - Alaska
Clarion River - Pennsylvania
Clark Fork - Montana, Idaho
Clarks Fork Yellowstone River - Wyoming, Montana
Clarks River - Tennessee, Kentucky
Clatskanie River - Oregon
Clavey River - California
Cle Elum River - Washington
Clear Creek - California
Clear Creek - Colorado
Clear Fork (Big South Fork Cumberland River) - Tennessee
Clear Fork (Cumberland River) - Kentucky, Tennessee
Clear Fork (Guyandotte River) - West Virginia
Clear Fork Mohican River - Ohio
Clear River - Rhode Island
Clear Stream - New Hampshire
Clearwater River - Idaho
Clearwater River (Queets River) - Olympic Peninsula of Washington
Clearwater River (White River) - Cascade Range in Washington
Clinch River - Virginia, Tennessee
Clinton River - Michigan
Clover Creek - Pennsylvania
Clyde River - Vermont

Co 
Coal River - West Virginia
Coan River - Virginia
Coast Fork Willamette River - Oregon
Cobb River - Minnesota
Cobbs Creek - Pennsylvania
Cocalico Creek - Pennsylvania
Cochato River - Massachusetts
Cocheco River - New Hampshire
Cockermouth River - New Hampshire
Cockle Creek - Virginia
Coeur d'Alene River - Idaho
Coginchaug River - Connecticut
Cohansey River - New Jersey
Cohas Brook - New Hampshire
Cohocton River -  New York
Cold River - Maine
Cold River (Bearcamp River) - eastern New Hampshire
Cold River (Connecticut River) - western New Hampshire
Cold River - New York
Cold Spring River - Virginia
Coldwater River (Branch County) - Michigan
Coldwater River (Isabella County) - Michigan
Coldwater River (Western Michigan) - Michigan
Coldwater River - Mississippi
Coleen River - Alaska
Coleman River - Georgia
Collawash River - Oregon
College Creek - Virginia
Collins River - Tennessee
Colorado River - Colorado, Utah, Arizona, Nevada, California
Colorado River - Texas
Columbia River - Washington, Oregon
Colville River - Alaska
Comal River - Texas
Combahee River - South Carolina
Comite River - Louisiana
Conasauga Creek - Tennessee
Conasauga River - Georgia, Tennessee
Concho River - Texas
Concord River - Massachusetts
Conecuh River - Alabama, Florida
Conejos River - Colorado
Conemaugh River - Pennsylvania
Conestoga River - Pennsylvania
Conewago Creek (east) - Pennsylvania
Conewago Creek (west) - Pennsylvania
Conewango Creek - Pennsylvania
Coney River - Wisconsin
Congaree River - South Carolina
Congdon River - Rhode Island
Conneaut Creek - Pennsylvania, Ohio
Connecticut River - New Hampshire, Vermont, Massachusetts, Connecticut
Connetquot River - New York
Connoquenessing Creek - Pennsylvania
Conococheague Creek - Pennsylvania, Maryland
Conodoguinet Creek - Pennsylvania
Contoocook River - New Hampshire
Conway River - Virginia
Coonamesset River - Massachusetts
Cooper River - New Jersey
Cooper River - South Carolina
Coos River - Oregon
Coosa River - Georgia, Alabama
Coosawattee River - Georgia
Coosawhatchie River - South Carolina
Copicut River - Massachusetts
Copper River - Alaska
Copperas Mine Fork - West Virginia
Coquille River - Oregon
Corrotoman River - Virginia
Cosna River - Alaska
Cossatot River - Arkansas
Cosumnes River - California
Cotley River - Massachusetts
Cottonwood River - Kansas
Cottonwood River - Minnesota
Couderay River - Wisconsin
Courtois Creek - Missouri
Cow Creek - Montana
Cowanesque River - Pennsylvania, New York
Coweeman River - Washington
Cowlitz River - Washington
Cowpasture River - Virginia
Coyote Creek - California

Cr - Cu 
Crab Creek - Washington
Cranberry River - Massachusetts
Cranberry River - West Virginia
Cranberry River - Wisconsin
Crawfish River - Wisconsin
Credit River - Minnesota
Crooked Creek - Pennsylvania
Crooked River - Massachusetts
Crooked River - Missouri
Crooked River - Oregon
Cross River - New York
Croton River - New York
Crow River - Minnesota
Crow Wing River - Minnesota
Crum Creek - Pennsylvania
Crystal River - Colorado
Crystal River - Florida
Crystal River - Michigan
Crystal River - Wisconsin
Cuivre River - Missouri
Cullasaja River - North Carolina
Cumberland River - Kentucky, Tennessee
Current River - Missouri, Arkansas
Cut River (Mackinac) and Cut River (Roscommon) - Michigan
Cut Bank Creek - Montana
Cutler River - New Hampshire
Cuyahoga River - Ohio
Cuyama River - California

C